West Side Story is a 1962 studio album by Oscar Peterson and his trio. The album features jazz interpretations of seven songs from the film West Side Story.

Track listing
"Something's Coming" – 3:57
"Somewhere" – 5:38
"Jet Song" – 7:49
"Tonight" – 4:38
"Maria" – 4:55
"I Feel Pretty" – 4:30
"Reprise" – 3:57

All songs composed by Leonard Bernstein with lyrics by Stephen Sondheim.

Personnel
Oscar Peterson - piano
Ray Brown - double bass
Ed Thigpen - drums

References

Oscar Peterson albums
1962 albums
Verve Records albums
Albums produced by Norman Granz